Stanley Peninsula, formerly known as Tai Tam Peninsula, is a peninsula of southern Hong Kong Island in Hong Kong. Located between Tai Tam Bay and Stanley Bay, it joins north to Hong Kong Island at the town of Stanley and ends to the south at Wong Ma Kok.

Climate

See also

 Wong Ma Kok Road - The main road in Stanley Peninsula.

References

Peninsulas of Hong Kong
Southern District, Hong Kong